Black Bill may refer to:

Black-billed (disambiguation)
Eladio Valdes, Cuban boxer
Bill Anderson, a Black man involved in the 1839 Marion riot